Alexander Hermansson (born March 8, 1988 in Karlstad, Sweden) is a professional Swedish ice hockey goaltender.

He is currently playing for Skåre in the third highest league in Sweden, on a loan from Färjestads BK. He has not played any games with Färjestad, but he has been the back-up goaltender for 9 games for Färjestad in the Swedish Elite League. Hermansson is not drafted by any NHL club.

Career statistics

External links

1988 births
Living people
Swedish ice hockey goaltenders
Färjestad BK players
Sportspeople from Karlstad